The rainbow surfperch (Hypsurus caryi), also known as rainbow seaperch, or bugara, is a species of surfperch found along the Pacific coast of North America from Cape Mendocino, California to northern Baja California, Mexico. This species grows to a length of  TL. This species is the only known member of its genus. The specific name honours Thomas Cary (1824-1888), a business man and amateur naturalist who was also the brother-in-law of Louis Agassiz who  procured specimens that confirmed that this species was viviparous.

References

External links
 Photograph

Embiotocidae
Taxa named by Louis Agassiz
Fish described in 1853